Aclytia reducta is a moth of the family Erebidae. It was described by Walter Rothschild in 1912. It is found in Brazil, Venezuela and Peru.

References

Moths described in 1912
Aclytia
Moths of South America